Chokri Bejaoui (born 25 January 1967) is a Tunisian football manager.

References

1967 births
Living people
Tunisian football managers
AS Djerba managers
US Tataouine managers
Olympique Béja managers
Club Athlétique Bizertin managers
Tunisian expatriate football managers
Expatriate football managers in Bahrain
Tunisian expatriate sportspeople in Bahrain